William P. Frye was a  four-masted steel barque named after a US Republican politician of the same name, from the state of Maine. Built by Arthur Sewall & Co of Bath, Maine she was sunk by the Imperial German Navy raider  in 1915. She was the first U.S. vessel sunk during World War I.

Sinking
In 1915 the UK was at war with Imperial Germany; the United States was not yet involved in the war and was officially neutral. Off the coast of Brazil, William P. Frye encountered the Imperial German Navy raider  on January 27, 1915. The Germans stopped and boarded the ship. While William P. Frye was U.S.-owned, and thus a neutral ship, her cargo was deemed a legitimate target because the Germans believed it was bound for Britain’s armed forces. The captain of Prinz Eitel Friedrich, Max Thierichens, ordered that William P. Fryes cargo of wheat be thrown overboard. When his orders were not followed fast enough, he took the ship's crew and passengers prisoner and scuttled her January 28, 1915. William P. Frye was the first American vessel sunk during World War I.

Aftermath

The crew and passengers of William P. Frye, including some women and children, were part of some 350 people taken prisoner from eleven different ships Prinz Eitel Friedrich had searched and destroyed. All 350 were released on March 10, 1915, when the German raider docked in the American port of Newport News, Virginia due to engine trouble. An outraged American government forced the Germans to apologize for the sinking. The owners of the ship, Arthur Sewall & Co., wanted damages for the sinking of the ship and presented a claim for $228,059.54 ($ in ).

See also
American entry into World War I
United States in World War I
William P. Frye

Annotations

Bibliography NotesReferences' 
 - Total pages: 448  

 - Total pages: 297 

Ships of Arthur Sewall & Co
1901 ships
Merchant ships of the United States
World War I merchant ships of the United States
Maritime incidents in 1915
Barques